Orchestina is a spider genus in the family Oonopidae, first described by Eugène Simon in 1882.

Species
, the World Spider Catalog accepts the following 162 species:

 Orchestina acaciae Henrard & Jocqué, 2012 — Tanzania
 Orchestina aerumnae Brignoli, 1978 — Bhutan
 Orchestina algerica Dalmas, 1916 — Algeria
 Orchestina ampulla Henrard & Jocqué, 2012 — Tanzania
 Orchestina andianavarroi Izquierdo, 2017 — Argentina
 Orchestina apiculata Liu, Xiao & Xu, 2016 — China
 Orchestina aproeste Izquierdo, 2017 — Brazil
 Orchestina arabica Dalmas, 1916 — Yemen
 Orchestina aragua Izquierdo, 2017 — Venezuela
 Orchestina arboleda Izquierdo, 2017 — Colombia
 Orchestina atocongo Izquierdo, 2017 — Peru
 Orchestina auburndalensis Izquierdo, 2017 — USA
 Orchestina aureola Tong & Li, 2011 — China
 Orchestina bedu Saaristo & van Harten, 2002 — Socotra
 Orchestina bialata Liu, Xiao & Xu, 2016 — China
 Orchestina bolivar Izquierdo, 2017 — Venezuela
 Orchestina bonaldoi Izquierdo, 2017 — Brazil
 Orchestina cachai Izquierdo, 2017 — Chile
 Orchestina cajamarca Izquierdo, 2017 — Peru
 Orchestina caleta Izquierdo, 2017 — Chile
 Orchestina cali Izquierdo, 2017 — Colombia
 Orchestina campana Izquierdo, 2017 — Panama
 Orchestina catarina Izquierdo, 2017 — Brazil
 Orchestina caxiuana Izquierdo, 2017 — Brazil
 Orchestina chaparrita Izquierdo, 2017 — Mexico
 Orchestina chiriqui Izquierdo, 2017 — Costa Rica, Panama
 Orchestina cincta Simon, 1893 — South Africa
 Orchestina clavigera Henrard & Jocqué, 2012 — Kenya
 Orchestina clavulata Tong & Li, 2011 — China
 Orchestina coari Izquierdo, 2017 — Brazil
 Orchestina codalmasi Wunderlich, 2011 — Malaysia
 Orchestina colubrina Liu, Henrard & Xu, 2019 — China
 Orchestina comaina Izquierdo, 2017 — Peru
 Orchestina communis Henrard & Jocqué, 2012 — Ghana to Kenya
 Orchestina cornuta Henrard & Jocqué, 2012 — Cameroon
 Orchestina cristinae Izquierdo, 2017 — Brazil, Paraguay, Argentina
 Orchestina crypta Henrard & Jocqué, 2012 — Congo
 Orchestina curico Izquierdo, 2017 — Chile
 Orchestina dalmasi Denis, 1956 — Morocco
 Orchestina debakkeri Henrard & Jocqué, 2012 — Ghana
 Orchestina dentifera Simon, 1893 — Caribbean. Introduced to Brazil, Tanzania, Réunion, Seychelles, Sri Lanka
 Orchestina divisor Izquierdo, 2017 — Brazil
 Orchestina dubia O. P.-Cambridge, 1911 — Britain
 Orchestina ebriola Brignoli, 1972 — Greece
 Orchestina ecuatoriensis Izquierdo, 2017 — Ecuador
 Orchestina elegans Simon, 1893 — Philippines
 Orchestina erwini Izquierdo, 2017 — Ecuador
 Orchestina fannesi Henrard & Jocqué, 2012 — Namibia, South Africa
 Orchestina fernandina Izquierdo, 2017 — Galapagos
 Orchestina filandia Izquierdo, 2017 — Colombia
 Orchestina flagella Saaristo & van Harten, 2006 — Yemen
 Orchestina flava Ono, 2005 — Japan
 Orchestina foa Saaristo & van Harten, 2002 — Socotra
 Orchestina fractipes Henrard & Jocqué, 2012 — West, Central Africa
 Orchestina furcillata Wunderlich, 2008 — Azores
 Orchestina galapagos Izquierdo, 2017 — Jamaica, Panama, Galapagos
 Orchestina gibbotibialis Henrard & Jocqué, 2012 — Kenya
 Orchestina gigabulbus Henrard & Jocqué, 2012 — Ghana
 Orchestina goblin Izquierdo, 2017 — Colombia, Ecuador, Peru
 Orchestina golem Izquierdo, 2017 — Ecuador, Peru, Brazil
 Orchestina granizo Izquierdo, 2017 — Chile
 Orchestina grismadoi Izquierdo, 2017 — Bolivia
 Orchestina griswoldi Izquierdo, 2017 — Costa Rica
 Orchestina guatemala Izquierdo, 2017 — Guatemala
 Orchestina hammamali Saaristo & van Harten, 2006 — Yemen
 Orchestina iemanja Izquierdo, 2017 — Brazil
 Orchestina infirma Seo, 2017 — Korea
 Orchestina intricata Henrard & Jocqué, 2012 — Somalia, Tanzania
 Orchestina itapety Izquierdo, 2017 — Brazil
 Orchestina jaiba Izquierdo, 2017 — Chile, Argentina
 Orchestina juruti Izquierdo, 2017 — Brazil
 Orchestina kairi Izquierdo, 2017 — Trinidad
 Orchestina kamehameha Izquierdo, 2017 — Hawaii
 Orchestina kasuku Henrard & Jocqué, 2012 — Congo
 Orchestina labarquei Izquierdo, 2017 — Panama
 Orchestina lahj Saaristo & van Harten, 2006 — Yemen
 Orchestina lanceolata Henrard & Jocqué, 2012 — Cameroon
 Orchestina laselva Izquierdo, 2017 — Costa Rica, Ecuador
 Orchestina launcestoniensis Hickman, 1932 — Tasmania
 Orchestina leon Izquierdo, 2017 — Brazil
 Orchestina longipes Dalmas, 1922 — Italy
 Orchestina losamigos Izquierdo, 2017 — Peru
 Orchestina luispi Izquierdo, 2017 — Argentina
 Orchestina macrofoliata Henrard & Jocqué, 2012 — Congo
 Orchestina madrededios Izquierdo, 2017 — Peru
 Orchestina magna Izquierdo, 2017 — Ecuador
 Orchestina mancocapac Izquierdo, 2017 — Peru
 Orchestina manicata Simon, 1893 — Sri Lanka, Vietnam
 Orchestina maracay Izquierdo, 2017 — Venezuela
 Orchestina maureen Saaristo, 2001 — Seychelles
 Orchestina mayo Izquierdo, 2017 — Ecuador
 Orchestina microfoliata Henrard & Jocqué, 2012 — Congo, Uganda
 Orchestina minutissima Denis, 1937 — Algeria, Spain
 Orchestina mirabilis Saaristo & van Harten, 2006 — Yemen
 Orchestina moaba Chamberlin & Ivie, 1935 — USA
 Orchestina molles Izquierdo, 2017 — Chile
 Orchestina moura Izquierdo, 2017 — Brazil
 Orchestina moyuchi Izquierdo, 2017 — Bolivia
 Orchestina multipunctata Liu, Xiao & Xu, 2016 — China
 Orchestina nadleri Chickering, 1969 — USA
 Orchestina nahuatl Izquierdo, 2017 — Mexico
 Orchestina nahuelbuta Izquierdo, 2017 — Chile
 Orchestina neblina Izquierdo, 2017 — Venezuela
 Orchestina obscura Chamberlin & Ivie, 1942 — USA
 Orchestina okitsui Oi, 1958 — Japan
 Orchestina osorno Izquierdo, 2017 — Chile
 Orchestina otonga Izquierdo, 2017 — Ecuador
 Orchestina pakitza Izquierdo, 2017 — Colombia, Peru
 Orchestina pan Izquierdo, 2017 — Panama
 Orchestina pandeazucar Izquierdo, 2017 — Chile
 Orchestina para Izquierdo, 2017 — Bolivia
 Orchestina paupercula Dalmas, 1916 — Gabon
 Orchestina pavesii (Simon, 1873) — Canary Is., Southwest Europe to Greece, Bulgaria, Algeria, Egypt, Yemen
 Orchestina pavesiiformis Saaristo, 2007 — Portugal, Spain, Israel. Introduced to USA, Brazil, Argentina, Uruguay
 Orchestina pilifera Dalmas, 1916 — Sri Lanka
 Orchestina pizarroi Izquierdo, 2017 — Chile
 Orchestina platnicki Izquierdo, 2017 — Colombia, Brazil, Argentina
 Orchestina predator Izquierdo, 2017 — Ecuador
 Orchestina probosciformis Henrard & Jocqué, 2012 — Congo, Uganda
 Orchestina quasimodo Izquierdo, 2017 — USA
 Orchestina quenies Izquierdo, 2017 — Chile
 Orchestina quijos Izquierdo, 2017 — Ecuador
 Orchestina ranchogrande Izquierdo, 2017 — Venezuela
 Orchestina rapaz Izquierdo, 2017 — Brazil
 Orchestina retiro Izquierdo, 2017 — Brazil
 Orchestina saaristoi Henrard & Jocqué, 2012 — Nigeria, Congo, Yemen
 Orchestina saltabunda Simon, 1893 — Venezuela
 Orchestina saltitans Banks, 1894 — USA
 Orchestina sanguinea Oi, 1955 — Japan
 Orchestina santodomingo Izquierdo, 2017 — Ecuador
 Orchestina sarava Izquierdo, 2017 — Brazil
 Orchestina saudade Izquierdo, 2017 — Brazil
 Orchestina sechellorum Benoit, 1979 — Seychelles
 Orchestina sedotmikha Saaristo, 2007 — Israel
 Orchestina setosa Dalmas, 1916 — Canary Is., France, Sardinia, Greece
 Orchestina shuar Izquierdo, 2017 — Ecuador
 Orchestina silvae Izquierdo, 2017 — Peru
 Orchestina simoni Dalmas, 1916 — Portugal, France, Italy, Greece, Turkey
 Orchestina sinensis Xu, 1987 — China, Taiwan
 Orchestina sotoi Izquierdo, 2017 — Ecuador, Brazil
 Orchestina storozhenkoi (Saaristo & Marusik, 2004) — Russia
 Orchestina striata Simon, 1909 — Vietnam
 Orchestina taruma Izquierdo, 2017 — Brazil
 Orchestina thoracica Xu, 1987 — China
 Orchestina topcui Danisman & Cosar, 2012 — Turkey
 Orchestina totoralillo Izquierdo, 2017 — Chile
 Orchestina truncata Wunderlich, 2004 — Costa Rica, Colombia, Ecuador
 Orchestina trunculata Tong & Li, 2011 — China, India
 Orchestina tubifera Simon, 1893 — Sri Lanka
 Orchestina tubulata Tong & Li, 2011 — China
 Orchestina tzantza Izquierdo, 2017 — Ecuador, Peru
 Orchestina ucumar Izquierdo, 2017 — Bolivia, Brazil, Argentina
 Orchestina utahana Chamberlin & Ivie, 1935 — USA, Mexico
 Orchestina vainuia Marples, 1955 — Samoa
 Orchestina valquiria Izquierdo, 2017 — Brazil
 Orchestina venezuela Izquierdo, 2017 — Venezuela
 Orchestina waorani Izquierdo, 2017 — Ecuador, Brazil
 Orchestina yanayacu Izquierdo, 2017 — Ecuador
 Orchestina yinggezui Tong & Li, 2011 — China
 Orchestina zhengi Tong & Li, 2011 — China
 Orchestina zhiwui Liu, Xu & Henrard, 2019 — China
 Orchestina zingara Izquierdo, 2017 — Colombia

See also
 List of Oonopidae species

References

External links

Oonopidae
Araneomorphae genera
Spiders of Africa
Spiders of Asia
Spiders of North America
Spiders of South America